Eujalmenus is a genus of beetles in the family Carabidae, containing the following species:

 Eujalmenus auricolor (Liebke, 1935)
 Eujalmenus besckei (Liebke, 1939)
 Eujalmenus gounellei (Liebke, 1935)
 Eujalmenus purpuratus (Liebke, 1935)

References

Lebiinae